The Places of Worship Registration Act 1855 is an Act of the Parliament of the United Kingdom which governs the registration and legal recognition of places of worship. It applies only in England and Wales, and does not cover the Church of England (that country's established church) which is exempt from the Act's requirements.  Nor does it affect the Church in Wales, which remains part of the Anglican Communion although it is no longer the Established Church in Wales.  Registration is not compulsory, but it gives certain financial advantages and is also required before a place of worship can be registered as a venue for marriages.

Overview
Under the terms of the Act, buildings, rooms or other premises can be registered as meeting places for religious worship upon payment of a fee; a record of their registration is then kept by the General Register Office for England and Wales, and the place of worship is assigned a "Worship Number".  Registration is not mandatory, but an unregistered place of worship cannot be used for the solemnisation of marriages.  There are also financial advantages: under the terms of the Charitable Trusts Act 1853 (as amended), registered places of worship are 'excepted charities', and do not have to subject their funds to inspection. Also, Council Tax is not levied on their premises.  This exemption has applied since 1955.  Since the passing of the Local Government Finance Act 1988, places of worship have not had to pay business rates; registration under the terms of the 1855 Act, while apparently not essential to gain exemption, "is an additional piece of evidence that the property is actively used as a place of worship".

Procedures
"Any person who is able to represent the congregation" of the place of worship—for example, a pastor, minister or trustee—must fill in a form published by the Home Office, Certifying a Place of Meeting for Religious Worship (Form 76), and send it to the Superintendent General of the General Register Office or a local Superintendent Registrar.  A fee of £28.00 is payable.  Details required on the form include the name, address and physical layout of the building or rooms, the Christian denomination or other faith group to which it belongs, an overview of the services that will take place, and details of the applicant.  There is great flexibility in relation to the naming of the faith group for which the building is being registered: for example, the Register contains entries for "Quaker", "Quakers", "Friends" and "Religious Society of Friends", all of which refer to the Quaker denomination.  Furthermore, some faith groups do not have a name, or specifically reject the concept of denominational names.  They are allowed to use the descriptions "Christians not otherwise designated" or "[a congregation or assembly of persons] who object to be designated by any distinctive religious appellation" respectively.  As of 2010 there were more than 1,500 places of worship registered to "Christians not otherwise designated", representing more than 5% of the national total.

If a registered place of worship is demolished and rebuilt on a different site, it must be re-registered under its new identity and assigned a new Worship Number, but more minor structural alterations do not affect the registration.  Changes of name must also be notified to the Superintendent General.  A place of worship which falls out of use should be de-registered by submitting another form, Notice of Disuse of a Certified Place of Meeting for Religious Worship (Form 77), to the Superintendent General.  Government advice states that this is a legal requirement, but research indicates that in practice not all disused places of worship are de-registered.  Details of de-registered places of worship are recorded in The London Gazette.

History

The Toleration Act 1688 granted most Protestant Nonconformist denominations freedom to worship in public buildings or rooms that were registered for this purpose.  Registration was done at a local level by a Clerk of the Peace or the local bishop.  The Roman Catholic Relief Act 1791 extended this freedom, and the obligation to register, to the Catholic Church.  The Places of Religious Worship Certifying Act 1852 superseded these Acts and gave the General Register Office the responsibility for maintaining the record of registered places of worship, but registration remained compulsory.  The Act of 1855 made it optional, but for a building to be used for marriages it had to be registered for worship first (or at the same time).

The Act stipulated that a list of all registered places of worship be published in 1856, "and also at such subsequent Periods as One of Her Majesty's Principal Secretaries of State shall from Time to Time in that Behalf order or direct".  In practice, neither full details of all registered places of worship nor extracts from the list have routinely been published by the General Register Office, but the full list was published online in 2010 in response to a Freedom of Information Request.  It lists all places of worship registered under the terms of the Act (excluding those subsequently deregistered), and gives their local government district, Worship Number (their unique reference number), name, address and the denomination to which they belong.  Also, a list of all registered places of worship was published on the government's gov.uk website on 17 March 2015 and has subsequently been updated regularly. It includes a list of around 30,000 records, including addresses and whether they are also registered for the solemnisation of marriages (opposite- and same-sex).

The fee for the registration of a place of worship has been revised upwards on many occasions.  When the Act was passed, registration cost 2s.6d..  The most recent piece of legislation setting the fee at £28.00 was The Registration of Births, Deaths and Marriages (Fees) Order 2002, which came into effect from 1 April 2003.

Case law
What counts as a place of worship has been the subject of litigation. An application by the Church of Scientology to have a chapel registered at Saint Hill Manor was rejected by the Registrar General in 1967. This rejection was upheld by the Court of Appeal in the case of R v Registrar General, ex p Segerdal. In 2013, the UK Supreme Court overturned Segerdal in the case of R (on the application of Hodkin and another) v Registrar General of Births, Deaths and Marriages, which concerned whether a marriage could be conducted at a Scientology property in London. Following the Hodkin decision, there is no longer a requirement of theistic belief in order to qualify as being a place of religious worship for the purpose of registration under the Act.

Notes

References

External links
 Freedom of Information request (April 2010) showing all registered places of worship
 Government of the United Kingdom's list (November 2016) of all places of worship registered for marriage, also showing all places of worship registered in accordance with the 1855 Act

United Kingdom Acts of Parliament 1855
Law about religion in the United Kingdom
1855 in England
1855 in Wales
Religious buildings and structures in the United Kingdom
1855 in religion
Religion in England
Religion in Wales